Launch Complex 26 (LC-26) is a deactivated launch site at Cape Canaveral Space Force Station, Florida. LC-26 consisted of two pads, A and B.  Pad A was used for the Jupiter-C and Juno I rockets, and was the launch site for Explorer 1, the United States' first satellite, in 1958.  Pad B was used for Juno II. Jupiter IRBMs were launched from both pads.

On February 1, 1958 (January 31 local time), the US Army Ballistic Missile Agency launched  Explorer 1 from LC-26A.

LC-26 is also the home of the Air Force Space and Missile Museum.  Access to the museum at LC-26 as well as the adjoining LC-5 and LC-6 by the general public can be arranged through the Kennedy Space Center Visitor Center "Cape Canaveral Early Space Tour".  The Cape Canaveral Space Force Station also offers monthly tours.

See also 
 List of Cape Canaveral and Merritt Island launch sites
 Jupiter IRBM
 Jupiter-C

External links 
 
 Air Force Space and Missile Museum virtual tour
 video clip of LC 26 blockhouse tour
 Official Air Force Space and Missile Museum website
 Spherical panoramas of Launch Complex 26 and Museum

Cape Canaveral Space Force Station